The Three Swordsmen is a 1994 Hong Kong wuxia film directed by Taylor Wong and starring Andy Lau, Brigitte Lin and Elvis Tsui in the roles of the titular swordsmen.

Plot
At the presentation for the title of the world's greatest martial artist, Siu Sam-siu (Andy Lau), Ming Kim (Brigitte Lin) and Wang To (Elvis Tsui) were tied for the title. However, Wang-to has retired from the jiang hu after he was branded as the leader of the Godly Blades Troupe by the Emperor, so the battle for the greatest martial artist would be a battle between Siu Sam-siu and Ming-kim, who are scheduled to fight at the first day of the next year. At the event, Butterfly, the younger sister of Ku Choi-yee, who is married to Ming Kim's older brother, pretends to be Ming in order to get close to Siu as she is an admirer of him so Siu shows up and easily dispatches her. Right afterwards, officers from the Godly Blades Troupe arrive and attack Siu, who defeat them with little effort. The officers then accuse Siu for sneaking into the imperial palace and stealing nthe Ngo-nan Sword and the Godly Jade Jar as well as murdering the Empress and claim he stole the sword to defeat Ming. Siu then flee the scene and arrive at Butterfly's home and bumps into his old lover, Red Leaves, who reveals she framed him for breaking her heart in the past, but he finds out the mastermind is the King of Yin-tun, the leader of the Ming-fa Sect, who was defeating Ming seven years ago and imprisoned at Half Day Horizon and his followers poisoned Red so they can kill him while he tries to heal her. Siu kills the followers before bringing Red to the Sword Storage Villa owned by Tik Suen, who Red is married to.

The next day, Wang leads the Godly Blades Troupe to Sword Storage Villa to arrest Siu and Tik also discovers Red has left as she cannot forget Siu. Wang's subordinate tells him Siu was seen running in the forest, but Siu was hiding in Butterfly's home. Siu then encounters Wang alone as Butterfly had led Wang's subordinates away. Siu tells Wang he was framed but the latter insists on completing his duties and they engage in a fight that interrupted when Tik arrives demanding Red back. Wang kills Tik and Siu takes the chance to flee and save Butterfly from Ming-fa Sect followers. Wang and his troupes catch up to Siu but Siu manages to fend them off and flee.

Siu then decides to go to the Half Day Horizon to investigate the truth as members of Ming-fa Sect are imprisoned there and Butterfly decides to follow while on the other hand, the Prince of Hau was ordered by the Emperor to lead the arrest of Siu. At the Half Day Horizon, Siu and Butterfly encounter Ming Kim and Choi-yee. Siu and Ming finds something suspicious underground and they work together to destroy it and finds the King of Yin-tun, who is thought to be dead, but he framed Siu and was plotting to seek revenge against Ming. Siu and Ming fight the King of Yin-tun, but the latter escapes right before the Prince of Hau and Wang arrive to arrest Siu. Ming and Wang both defend Siu's innocence but Hau insists on arresting Siu, but Yin-tun returns to set a fire and Siu fights and humiliates Hau before fleeing and Hau declares he will arrive at Ming Kim Villa to arrest Siu 15 days later.

Wang's subordinate informs him that Red is healing from her poisoned and Wang finds out from the doctor that the origin of the poison came from a foreign flower brought in by Yin-tun. After Ming defeated Yin-tun, Ming destroyed all of the flower and planted in Ming Kim Villa for his sister-in-law, Choi-yee, who came from a foreign land, so Wang suspects someone in Ming Kim Villa is framing Siu, who is staying there to heal his wounds from his fight with Yin-tun. Siu suddenly leaves Ming Kim Villa which leads suspicion from Ming's mother, but Siu returns with the Ming's family sword manual stolen by Hau. Later, Butterfly decides she wants to be married to Siu and gains the approval of her family. At the night of the wedding, Red suddenly arrive and warns Siu of danger. Yin-tun, disguised as Butterfly, reveals himself and injures Siu and Red before hiding in Choi-yee's room and is revealed Choi-yee was the mastermind in framing Siu. Yin-tun berates Choi-yee for not killing Ming-kim, who she is in love him and takes her child hostage, but she kills him. However, everything was overhead by Butterfly so Choi-yee captures Butterfly. As Red dies from her injuries, she gives Siu a piece of jade.

Hau arrives at Ming Kim Villa with Wang and the Prince and his to arrest Siu and Wang proposes a duel with Siu. Before they fight, Siu gives Red's jade to Wang which gives clues to who framed him. As the two fight, Siu pretends to kill Wang which causes Choi-yee to pick up the jade andr revealing herself to be the mastermind for framing Siu. When stolen Jade Jar and Yin-tun's body were found in Choi-yee's room and forces Siu and Ming to duel in order to find the whereabouts of Butterfly, only revealing it to the Prince and telling him to only reveal to the winner. Choi-yee then throws her child in the air and causes Ming to draw his sword which she uses to kill herself and tells him she did everything so he can defeat Siu and become the world's greatest martial artist

At the day of their duel, Ming purposely gets injured by Wang in order to have a fair fight with Siu, who is still injured from fighting Yin-tun. During the battle, the Prince long for more excitement, so Wang fulfills his request by destroying the whereabouts of Butterfly which turns it into a three-way fight. However, Wang is actually using the opportunity to reveal where Butterfly is, who is hidden in a coffin hanging nearby. Wang informs the Prince he will be leaving him and retiring from the jiang hu while Ming admits defeat to Siu, proclaiming the latter the be world's greatest martial artist, but Siu does not care about the title and is relieved that Butterfly is safe.

Cast
Andy Lau as Siu Sam-siu (笑三少, lit: "Smiling Third Master"), founder of the Eight-Foot Gate (八尺門) who is framed for stealing several imperial treasures and killing the Empress.
Brigitte Lin as Ming Kim (名劍, lit: "Famed Sword"), leader of the Ming Kim Villa (名劍山莊) who defeated the King of Yin-tun seven years ago and won the title of the world's greatest martial artist for seven consecutive years afterwards.
Elvis Tsui as Wang To (橫刀, lit: "Horizontal Blade"), a crime fighter who defeated gang leader Lung Tin-hang and was branded as the leader of the Godly Blades Troupe by the Emperor.
Yu Li as Ku Choi-yee (顧彩衣), wife of Ming Kim's older brother, the disabled Ming Chin, but is in love with Kim and frames Siu Sam-siu in order to help Kim win the title of the world's greatest martial artist.
Siqin Gaowa as Ming-kim's mother
Leung Sze-ho as Prince (太子), the Emperor's cowardly, useless, spoiled son.
Lisa Tung as Butterfly (蝶舞), Choi-yee's younger sister who admirers Siu Sam-siu and has a crush on him.
Cao Ying as Madame Red Leaves (紅葉夫人), Siu Sam-siu's ex-lover who was forced and poisoned by Choi-yee to frame Siu and is still in love with him despite being married to Tik Suen.
Kan Tak-mau as Hak-lin Chun-shu (赫連春樹), the Emperor's younger brother who is the Prince of Hau (侯爺) and is bent on arresting Siu Sam-siu but is too incompetent to do so.
Chiu Chin as King of Yin-tun (燕敦煌), the leader of Ming-fa Sect (明花流) who is a devil with the martial world and was defeated by Ming Kim seven years ago, where he faked his death and plotted for revenge.
Choi Chin
Wong Chung-yuk

Box office
The film grossed HK$3,545,666 at the Hong Kong box office during its theatrical run from 25 August to 2 September 1994 in Hong Kong.

See also
Andy Lau filmography

External links

The Three Swordsmen at Hong Kong Cinemagic

The Three Swordsmen film review at LoveHKFilm.com

1994 films
1994 action films
1994 martial arts films
Hong Kong action films
Hong Kong martial arts films
Wuxia films
Kung fu films
Martial arts tournament films
1990s Cantonese-language films
Films set in China
Films directed by Taylor Wong
1990s Hong Kong films